Beijing has many neighborhoods, some of which are new and others with a long history.

Prominent neighborhoods 

 Qianmen 
 Tian'anmen 
 Di'anmen 
 Chongwenmen 
 Xuanwumen 
 Fuchengmen 
 Xizhimen 
 Deshengmen 
 Andingmen 
 Sanlitun 
 Dongzhimen 
 Chaoyangmen 
 Yongdingmen 
 Zuo'anmen 
 You'anmen 
 Guangqumen 
 Guang'anmen 
 Huashi 
 Xibianmen 
 Hepingmen 
 Fuxingmen 
 Jianguomen 
 Gongzhufen 
 Fangzhuang 
 Guomao 
 Hepingli 
 Ping'anli 
 Beixinqiao 
 Jiaodaokou  
 Kuanjie 
 Wangjing  
 Wangfujing  
 Dengshikou 
 Wudaokou  
 Xidan 
 Dongdan 
 Zhongguancun 
 Panjiayuan 
 Beijing CBD 
 Yayuncun 
 Shifoying

Ethnic enclaves
In the case of some enclaves the name starts with the name of the originating province and the name ends in cun (C: 村, P: cūn) or "Village". For instance, Anhuicun or "Anhui Village" houses people from that room, and Henancun or "Henan Village" has settlers from that region.

Several ethnic enclaves house rural migrant workers based on their origin, such as Henancun and Zhejiangcun (Zhejiang Village). Other ethnic enclaves consist of ethnic minorities who are established as permanent Beijing residents, including several Hui people settlements, such as Niujie and Madian,

Wenfei Wang, Shangyi Zhou, and Cindy Fan wrote that Hui people, despite being permanent Beijingers, are "highly segregated" from Han people "socially and spatially". They added that the survival of Hui neighborhoods in Beijing is "solely dependent on the existing Hui residents and communities" because the communities are "not as readily replenished by new migrants" and because Hui see themselves as Beijingers and their communities as having "more permanent meanings" compared to migrant worker communities.

Migrant worker enclaves
Residents of the migrant worker enclaves support each other in looking for jobs and dealing with the local government. Inhabitants consider themselves "compatriots" (S: 同乡, P: tóngxiāng), a word equivalent to the English "homies". In the rural migrant worker communities there is a high turnover as members arrive for work and leave to go back to their hometowns. Some residents work in family workshops and go to the city to sell their wares while others commute to work within the city. Most residents plan to eventually return to their home lands and do not consider themselves to be from Beijing. Even though the rural migrant workers are also Han Chinese they are considered to be of a lower status because they are not permanent residents and because they have rural upbringings and low socioeconomic statuses, so each community, in the words of Wenfei Wang, Shangyi Zhou, and Cindy Fan, "connotes a native place–based ethnicity distinct from the urbanites".

During periods the Beijing government has attempted to dismantle ethnic villages in the periphery of Beijing. In the 1990s the government made attempts to dismantle Zhejiangcun, including one time in 1995, and had also acted against Henancun (C: 河南村, P: Hénán-cūn) and Xinjiangcun.

While Uighurs, like the Hui, are Muslim, the Uighurs in Beijing had migrated there more recently than the Hui. Wenfei Wang, Shangyi Zhou, and C. Cindy Fan, authors of "Growth and Decline of Muslim Hui Enclaves in Beijing," stated that the Beijing Uighur communities are "much smaller in size" compared to Hui communities.

See also
 Geography of Beijing

References
 Deng, F. Frederick and Youqin Huang (Department of Geography and Planning, SUNY Albany). "Uneven land reform and urban sprawl in China: the case of Beijing" (Archive). Progress in Planning 61 (2004) 211–236. Accepted October 27, 2003.
 Friedmann, John. China's Urban Transition. University of Minnesota Press, 2005. , 9781452907413.
 Wang, Wenfei, Shangyi Zhou, and C. Cindy Fan. "Growth and Decline of Muslim Hui Enclaves in Beijing" (Archive). Eurasian Geography and Economics, 2002, 43, No. 2, pp. 104–122.

Notes

Neighbourhoods of Beijing